"She's on Fire" is the third single from Train's second album, Drops of Jupiter.

Track listing
2002 Australian single
"She's on Fire" (radio version)
"Drops of Jupiter (Tell Me)" (live)
"Meet Virginia" (live)
"Ramble On" (acoustic)

2002 European single
"She's on Fire" (radio version)
"Drops of Jupiter (Tell Me)" (live)
"Meet Virginia" (live)
"She's on Fire" (video)

DVD single
 "She's on Fire" (Music video)
 "Meet Virginia" (Music video)
 "Drops of Jupiter (Tell Me)" (Live music video from The Warfield)

Charts

In popular culture 
The song is featured in The Animal (but not the soundtrack), and the soundtrack of Rugrats Go Wild.

References

2002 singles
Train (band) songs
Song recordings produced by Brendan O'Brien (record producer)